Perry Township is one of the nine townships of Marion County, Indiana, United States, located in the south central part of the county. It was laid out in 1822 by the U.S. Army Corps of Engineers and named after Oliver Hazard Perry – a War of 1812 hero. The township population was 108,972 at the 2010 census. This includes the largest community of Burmese-Americans in the United States, numbering over 24,000. Through the White River, Perry and Decatur townships share the only water boundary among Marion County's townships.

Schools in Perry Township include Roncalli, Perry Meridian and Southport high schools.

Geography

Municipalities 
 Beech Grove (southwest third)
 Homecroft
 Indianapolis (partial)
 Southport

Communities 
 University Heights

See also
Metropolitan School District of Perry Township

References

External links
 Indiana Township Association
 United Township Association of Indiana

Townships in Marion County, Indiana
Geography of Indianapolis
Townships in Indiana